The Allied Pilots Association (APA) is the labor union representing American Airlines pilots. APA was founded in 1963 by a group of American Airlines pilots who broke away from the Air Line Pilots Association (ALPA). The five founding pilots of APA, Nick O'Connell, Paul Atkins, Bob Guba, Joe Garvey, and Dick Lyons, were expelled for life from ALPA. The first headquarters was located in New York City before it moved to Fort Worth, Texas.

History
In 2001, on its pilots' behalf, APA filed a lawsuit against American Airlines. The airline attempted to circumvent scope clause that placed limits on regional flying. It did so by altering the AmericanConnection IATA code to AX for flights operated by Chautauqua and Trans States. The issue was settled in 2007 when a federal arbitrator ordered American to pay $23 million to APA members for violating the scope clause.

The merger of American and US Airways resulted in the carriers' pilot labor organizations to be combined. In 2014, USAPA merged into the much larger APA. At the time, USAPA had been under a permanent federal injunction but asked the judge to have the injunction lifted, as the merger brought an industry standard contract. The protagonist organization that opposed USAPA, known as America West Airlines Pilots Protective Alliance (AWAPPA), was dissolved.

References

External links
 American Pilots Act to Form New Union. // Aviation Week & Space Technology, April 15, 1963, v. 78, no. 15, p. 41.
 Court Delays Stall New Pilot Union. // Aviation Week & Space Technology, July 8, 1963, v. 79, no. 2, p. 28.
 Allied Pilots' Association website
 American Airlines website

Trade unions in the United States
Airline pilots' trade unions
Trade unions established in 1963